Moufida Tlatli (4 August 19477 February 2021) was a Tunisian film director, screenwriter, and editor.  She is noted for her breakthrough film The Silences of the Palace in 1994, which won several international awards.  She went on to direct two more films: The Season of Men (2000) and Nadia and Sarra (2004).

Early life
Moufida Tlatli was born in Sidi Bou Said, a suburb of the capital Tunis, on 4 August 1947.  Her interest in cinema was piqued by her philosophy teacher.  She moved to Paris in 1965, where she studied film editing and screenplay at the Institut des hautes études cinématographiques.  She subsequently went back to Tunisia in 1972 and started off as a film editor.  One of the notable films she edited was Halfaouine Child of the Terraces (1990) by Férid Boughedir.

Career
Moufida Tlatli made her directorial debut with The Silences of the Palace (1994).  She drew inspiration for the film from the challenging experiences her mother endured as an Arab woman.  The film was acclaimed critically and won several awards: Cannes Film Festival's Golden Camera, the Carthage Film Festival's Golden Tanit, British Film Institute's Sutherland Trophy, Toronto Film Festival's International Critics' Award, and Istanbul International Film Festival's Golden Tulip.  It was later categorized as one of the ten best films from Africa by film director and critic Mark Cousins in September 2012.

The second film Moufida Tlatli directed, The Season of Men (2000), was screened in the Un Certain Regard section at the Cannes Film Festival that year.  It was awarded the Grand Prix by the Arab World Institute, as well as awards at film festivals held in Namur, Valencia, Torino, and Stuttgart.  She subsequently sat as a juror of the Cannes Film Festival.  She became only the second director from the Maghreb to do so, after Boughedir one decade before.  Her third and final film, Nadia and Sarra (2004), featured Palestinian actor–director Hiam Abbass in the title role.

Later life
Tlatli was appointed as Minister of Culture by Tunisia's provisional government in 2011, following the Tunisian Revolution and the ousting of president Zine El Abidine Ben Ali.  

Tlatli died of COVID-19 on 7 February 2021, at age 73. She was survived by her husband, Mohamed Tlatli, her daughter Selima Chaffai and son, Walid, and five grandchildren.

Filmography

Editor 
 1972: In The Land of Trannani
 1974: Sajnène
 1974: A People's Victory
 1975: Fatma 75
 1977: Omar Katlato
 1978: A Ball and Dreams
 1979: Nahla
 1980: Aziza
 1982: Shadows of The Earth
 1983: Crossings
 1984: Wanderers of The Desert
 1986: Arab
 1987: Arab Camera
 1988: The Trace
 1989: Leila's My Reason
 1990: The Song of The Rock
 1990: Halfaouine: Boy of the Terraces

 1994: The Fire Dance
 1994: The Silences of the Palace
 2000: The Season of Men
 2004: Nadia and Sarra

Director
 1994: The Silences of the Palace
 2000: The Season of Men
 2004: Nadia and Sarra

Writer
 1994: The Silences of the Palace
 2000: The Season of Men
 2004: Nadia and Sarra

References

1947 births
2021 deaths
Tunisian women film directors
Tunisian film directors
People from Tunis Governorate
Tunisian expatriates in France
Tunisian screenwriters
Deaths from the COVID-19 pandemic in Tunisia